This is a list of bestselling novels in the United States in the 1920s, as determined by Publishers Weekly. The list features the most popular novels of each year from 1920 through 1929.

The standards set for inclusion in the lists – which, for example, led to the exclusion of the novels in the Harry Potter series from the lists for the 1990s and 2000s – are currently unknown.

1920
 The Man of the Forest by Zane Grey
 Kindred of the Dust by Peter B. Kyne
 The Re-Creation of Brian Kent by Harold Bell Wright
 The River's End by James Oliver Curwood
 A Man for the Ages by Irving Bacheller
 Mary-Marie by Eleanor H. Porter
 The Portygee by Joseph C. Lincoln
 The Great Impersonation by E. Phillips Oppenheim
 The Lamp in the Desert by Ethel M. Dell
 Harriet and the Piper by Kathleen Norris

1921
 Main Street by Sinclair Lewis
 The Brimming Cup by Dorothy Canfield
 The Mysterious Rider by Zane Grey
 The Age of Innocence by Edith Wharton
 The Valley of Silent Men by James Oliver Curwood
 The Sheik by Edith M. Hull
 A Poor Wise Man by Mary Roberts Rinehart
 Her Father's Daughter by Gene Stratton-Porter
 The Sisters-in-Law by Gertrude Atherton
 The Kingdom Round the Corner by Coningsby Dawson

1922
 If Winter Comes by A. S. M. Hutchinson
 The Sheik by Edith M. Hull
 Gentle Julia by Booth Tarkington
 The Head of the House of Coombe by Frances Hodgson Burnett
 Simon Called Peter by Robert Keable
 The Breaking Point by Mary Roberts Rinehart
 This Freedom by A. S. M. Hutchinson
 Maria Chapdelaine by Louis Hémon
 To the Last Man by Zane Grey
 Tie: Babbitt by Sinclair Lewis and Helen of the Old House by Harold Bell Wright

1923
 Black Oxen by Gertrude Atherton
 His Children's Children by Arthur Train
 The Enchanted April by "Elizabeth"
 Babbitt by Sinclair Lewis
 The Dim Lantern by Temple Bailey
 This Freedom by A. S. M. Hutchinson
 The Mine with the Iron Door by Harold Bell Wright
 Wanderer of the Wasteland by Zane Grey
 The Sea Hawk by Rafael Sabatini
 The Breaking Point by Mary Roberts Rinehart

1924
 So Big by Edna Ferber
 The Plastic Age by Percy Marks
 The Little French Girl by Anne Douglas Sedgwick
 The Heirs Apparent by Philip Gibbs
 A Gentleman of Courage by James Oliver Curwood
 The Call of the Canyon by Zane Grey
 The Midlander by Booth Tarkington
 The Coast of Folly by Coningsby Dawson
 Mistress Wilding by Rafael Sabatini
 The Homemaker by Dorothy Canfield Fisher

1925
 Soundings by A. Hamilton Gibbs
 The Constant Nymph by Margaret Kennedy
 The Keeper of the Bees by Gene Stratton-Porter
 Glorious Apollo by E. Barrington
 The Green Hat by Michael Arlen
 The Little French Girl by Anne Douglas Sedgwick
 Arrowsmith by Sinclair Lewis
 The Perennial Bachelor by Anne Parrish
 The Carolinian by Rafael Sabatini
 One Increasing Purpose by A. S. M. Hutchinson

1926
 The Private Life of Helen of Troy by John Erskine
 Gentlemen Prefer Blondes by Anita Loos
 Sorrell and Son by Warwick Deeping
 The Hounds of Spring by Sylvia Thompson
 Beau Sabreur by P. C. Wren
 The Silver Spoons by John Galsworthy
 Beau Geste by P. C. Wren
 Show Boat by Edna Ferber
 After Noon by Susan Ertz
 The Blue Window by Temple Bailey

1927
 Elmer Gantry by Sinclair Lewis
 The Plutocrat by Booth Tarkington
 Doomsday by Warwick Deeping
 Sorrell and Son by Warwick Deeping
 Jalna by Mazo de la Roche
 Lost Ecstasy by Mary Roberts Rinehart
 Twilight Sleep by Edith Wharton
 Tomorrow Morning by Anne Parrish
 The Old Countess by Anne Douglas Sedgwick
 A Good Woman by Louis Bromfield

1928
 The Bridge of San Luis Rey by Thornton Wilder
 Wintersmoon by Hugh Walpole
 Swan Song by John Galsworthy
 The Greene Murder Case by S. S. Van Dine
 Bad Girl by Viña Delmar
 Claire Ambler by Booth Tarkington
 Old Pybus by Warwick Deeping
 All Kneeling by Anne Parrish
 Jalna by Mazo de la Roche
 The Strange Case of Miss Annie Spragg by Louis Bromfield

1929
 All Quiet on the Western Front by Erich Maria Remarque
 Dodsworth by Sinclair Lewis
 Dark Hester by Anne Douglas Sedgwick
 The Bishop Murder Case by S. S. Van Dine
 Roper's Row by Warwick Deeping
 Peder Victorious by O. E. Rolvaag
 Mamba's Daughters by DuBose Heyward
 The Galaxy by Susan Ertz
 Scarlet Sister Mary by Julia Peterkin
 Joseph and His Brethren by H. W. Freeman

References

Bestselling novels in the United States
Novels
1920s books